The Université of 20 août 1955 of Skikda is a university located in Skikda, Algeria.

The University of Skikda was created by Executive Decree No. 01/272 of 18 September 2001.

See also 
 List of universities in Algeria

External links
 http://www.univ-skikda.dz/

2001 establishments in Algeria
Educational institutions established in 2001
Skikda
Buildings and structures in Skikda Province